Kyle Farren Hudlin (born 15 June 2000) is an English professional footballer who plays for Huddersfield Town, as a striker.

Career
Hudlin began his career with Midland Football League clubs Castle Vale Town, Boldmere Sports & Social Falcons and Solihull United, before signing for Solihull Moors in October 2020. During his time with the club, he scored 13 goals in 58 National League games and 17 in 69 games in all competitions. 

In July 2022, he signed for Huddersfield Town on a two-year contract, initially joining their B team. Later that month he moved on loan to AFC Wimbledon. He scored his first goal for Wimbledon in an EFL Trophy tie against Crawley Town on 20 September 2022. Hudlin was recalled by Huddersfield on 4 January 2023.

Personal life
He is recognized as being one of the tallest footballers in the world with a height of 206 cm (6 ft 9 inches).

Career statistics

References

External links

2000 births
Living people
English footballers
Association football forwards
Solihull Moors F.C. players
Huddersfield Town A.F.C. players
AFC Wimbledon players
National League (English football) players
English Football League players